This is a list of members of the Northern Territory Legislative Council from 23 January 1957 to 20 February 1960.

The council consisted of 14 members. Six members were elected to four single-member electorates (Alice Springs, Batchelor, Stuart and Tennant Creek), and one two-member electorate (Darwin). Seven members (called Official Members) were appointed by the Australian government, all of whom were senior public servants in the Northern Territory. The Administrator of the Northern Territory, James Archer, served as presiding officer (or president) of the council.

The 1957 elections had stressed the need for reform of the council, with virtually unanimous support in the council for elected members to constitute a majority. In 1958, a year after the first meeting of the council, every elected member resigned in frustration with the refusal of the federal government to announce such a reform. The resignations triggered by-elections on 28 June for all seats—in effect, although not in application of the Northern Territory (Administration) Act 1947, another general election. All previous members were elected unopposed, except for Len Purkiss, who was re-elected with an increased majority in Tennant Creek.

See also
1957 Northern Territory general election
1958 Northern Territory by-elections

References

Members of Northern Territory parliaments by term